"Carita De Inocente" (English: "Innocent Little Face") is a song by Dominican-American singer Prince Royce from Royce's sixth studio album, Alter Ego (2020). The music video premiered on February 21, 2020. On June 3, 2020, Royce released a remix featuring Puerto Rican rapper Myke Towers. The music video for the remix version premiered on September 3, 2020.

Charts

Weekly charts

Year-end charts

Certifications

See also
List of Billboard Latin Airplay number ones of 2020
List of Billboard Tropical Airplay number ones of 2020

References

2020 singles
2020 songs
Prince Royce songs
Sony Music Latin singles
Songs written by Prince Royce
Spanish-language songs